Trischistognatha yepezi is a moth in the family Crambidae. It is found in Venezuela and Costa Rica.

References

Moths described in 1973
Evergestinae